Colruyt is a chain of supermarkets, started at Lembeek near Halle, Belgium. Colruyt carries the surname of the founder of the family business, the Colruyt family still owns the company.

Colruyt is part of Colruyt Group, a Belgian multinational family business in wholesale distribution that evolved from the Colruyt supermarkets. It is competing with hard discounters such as Aldi and Lidl in Benelux countries where it is a well established market leader. The current manager is Jef Colruyt.

The company's retail trade division includes the direct supply of products to retail customers operating through brands Colruyt, OKay, Bio-Planet, DreamLand and ColliShop, among others. The company supplies to wholesalers and affiliated independent merchants in Belgium, France and Luxembourg. It also supplies fuels through DATS 24 filling stations in Belgium and France, provides printing and document management solutions (Druco/Mitto) and engineering activities (Intrion), and produces renewable energy (WE Power).

History

 1925 – Franz Colruyt, baker at Lembeek (near Halle) creates his own business in colonial goods (coffee, spices, etc.).
 1950 – Creation of the "nv Ets Franz Colruyt", food wholesaler, which will over time become Colruyt Group
 1958 – Jo Colruyt and his brothers take over the management of the company GV
 1994 – Death of Jo Colruyt. His son Jef Colruyt succeeds him.

References

External links 

  

Supermarkets of Belgium
Belgian brands
Companies based in Flemish Brabant